Power Cut is a 2012 Indian Punjabi romantic comedy film. It was the last film directed by Jaspal Bhatti and produced by Paveljeet Singh under P & R Films and Mad Arts, Jaspal Bhatti Film School. The lead actors include Jaspal Bhatti himself, his wife Savita Bhatti and several well-known Punjabi actors. The film was released on 26 October 2012 worldwide. The movie mocks the power outages and corruption in India, especially in the state of Punjab.

Death of Jaspal Bhatti
Jaspal Bhatti died in a car accident whilst on a promotional tour for the film on 25 October 2012, just one day before its release. Bhatti was well known for his comedy in all over India.

Cast
 Jaspal Bhatti as Pala 
 Savita Bhatti as Preeto, wife of Pala 
 Jasraj Singh Bhatti as Ashwinderpal Ritu Raj Singh (Ashu)
 Surilie Gautam as Bijli
 Jaswinder Bhalla as Bala
 Prem Chopra as Minister
 B N Sharma as Surjit Singh, Thali Maker
 Gurchet Chitrakar as Dhokha Rai, 
 Rajesh Puri as S.K.Nehra, Chairman
Surendra Sharma as Prem Chopra's P.A
 Chandan Prabhakar as Lineman Khamba Ram
 Zafar Khan as Current, son of Bala 
 Jony Saini

References 

2012 films
Punjabi-language Indian films
2010s Punjabi-language films